In molecular biology, DiGeorge syndrome critical region gene 5 (non-protein coding), also known as DGCR5, is a long non-coding RNA. In humans, it is located on chromosome 22q11, at the ADU breakpoint associated with DiGeorge syndrome. Its expression is regulated by the transcription factor REST (RE1-Silencing Transcription factor).

See also 
 Long noncoding RNA

References

Further reading 

 

Non-coding RNA